Saul Shotton (born 10 November 2000) is an English professional footballer who plays as a midfielder for F.C. Lambourne. In the coors premier division.

Club career

Bury
Born in Stoke-on-Trent, Shotton started his career with Stoke City prior to his move to Bury in 2017. Having progressed through the club's youth structure, he made his first team debut in September 2018. On 19 September 2017, he made his debut for Bury in their EFL Trophy defeat to Rochdale, featuring for the entire 90 minutes in the 4–0 loss. Following this, Shotton was an unused substitute on several occasions before making his league debut in April 2018, in a 3–3 draw with Doncaster Rovers.

Ahead of the forthcoming 2018–19 campaign, Shotton, along with two fellow graduates, signed their first professional contracts. To March 2019, he has not played for the first team in 2018–19 but is an active member of the club's under-18 team.

West Bromwich Albion
He left the club after they were expelled from the Football League in August 2019, signing for West Bromwich Albion in September 2019. On 5 January 2020, Shotton made his debut for the club in their third round FA Cup tie against Charlton Athletic, replacing Rekeem Harper in the 95th minute during the 1–0 away victory.

On 2 October 2020, Shotton signed for National League side Woking on loan until January 2021. A day later, he made his debut for the club, playing the full 90 minutes in their 2020–21 National League opener against Solihull Moors, which resulted in a 2–1 victory for The Cards. Shotton made 18 appearances in all competitions for Woking, before returning to West Bromwich Albion in January 2021.

During the 2021–22 campaign, Shotton made his first West Bromwich Albion start during an EFL Cup second round tie against Premier League side, Arsenal, playing the full 90 in the 6–0 defeat.

On 29 October 2021, Shotton joined National League North side, AFC Telford United on a three-month loan.

Non-league
Shotton was released by West Bromwich Albion in the summer of 2022 when his contract expired and he subsequently dropped back into non-league permanently when he signed for newly-promoted Northern Premier League Midlands Division side Hanley Town, joining up to play with his cousin Ryan.

Personal life
He is the cousin of Ryan Shotton.

Career statistics

References

2000 births
Living people
English footballers
Footballers from Stoke-on-Trent
Association football defenders
English Football League players
National League (English football) players
Stoke City F.C. players
Bury F.C. players
West Bromwich Albion F.C. players
Woking F.C. players
AFC Telford United players
Hanley Town F.C. players